Events from the year 1927 in Mexico.

Incumbents

Federal government
President: Plutarco Elías Calles

Governors
 Aguascalientes: Isaac Díaz de León 
 Campeche: Ángel Castillo Lanz/Silvestre Pavón Silva 
 Chiapas: Luis P. Vidal/Federico Martínez Rojas
 Chihuahua: Jesús Antonio Almeida/Manuel Mascareñas/Fernando Orozco 
 Coahuila: Manuel Pérez Treviño
 Colima: Laureano Cervantes
 Durango: 
 Guanajuato: Agustín Arroyo
 Guerrero: Héctor F. López 
 Hidalgo: Matías Rodríguez
 Jalisco: 
 State of Mexico: Carlos Riva Palacio
 Michoacán: : Enrique Ramírez Aviña 
 Morelos: Ambrosio Puente 
 Nayarit: José de la Peña Ledón 
 Nuevo León: José Benítez
 Oaxaca: Genaro V. Vázquez 
 Puebla: Donato Bravo Izquierdo
 Querétaro: Abraham Araujo
 San Luis Potosí: Saturnino Cedillo
 Sinaloa: vacant
 Sonora: Fausto Topete
 Tabasco: Tomás Taracena Hernández
 Tamaulipas: Juan Rincón	
 Tlaxcala: 
 Veracruz: Abel S. Rodríguez
 Yucatán: Álvaro Torre Díaz
 Zacatecas:

Events
January 1 – Cristero War: Rebellion begins with a manifesto issued by René Capistrán Garza.
Sara García makes her only screen appearance between 1918 and 1933, as an extra in Yo soy tu padre.

Births
January 1 – Raúl Valerio, actor (d. 2017)
February 3 – Sarah Jiménez, engraving artist, member of the Salón de la Plástica Mexicana; (d. 2017)
February 4 — Enrique Cárdenas González, politician (PRI), Governor of Tamaulipas (1975-1981) (d. 2018).
August 27 – Adolfo Mexiac, graphic artist (d. 2019).
August 28 — Claudio Brook, actor, winner of two Ariel Awards (d. 1995).
September 15 – Ricardo Miledi, neuro-scientist (Academia Mexicana de Ciencias y de la Academia Nacional de Medicina de México) (d. 2017).
October 26 – Fernando Gutiérrez Barrios, politician (d. 2000)
October 28 – Rafael Gallardo García, bishop of Roman Catholic Diocese of Linares (1974-1987) and Roman Catholic Diocese of Tampico (1987-2003), d. January 30, 2021
November 27 – Sergio Bravo, footballer

Deaths
January 17 – Jenaro Sánchez Delgadillo, Catholic priest (born 1886; executed by the Mexican military during the Cristero War)
February 6 – Mateo Correa Magallanes, Catholic priest (born 1866; executed).
April 1 – José Dionisio Luis Padilla Gómez, priest (born 1899; executed) 
April 21 – Román Adame Rosales (born 1859; executed)
April 27 – Anacleto González Flores, lawyer (born 1888; executed)
May 25 – Cristóbal Magallanes Jara (born 1869; executed) and Agustín Caloca Cortés (born 1898; Catholic priests, executed)
June 26 – José María Robles Hurtado, Catholic priest (born 1888; executed)
August 7 – Miguel de la Mora de la Mora, Catholic priest (executed)
October 28 – Rodrigo Aguilar Alemán, Catholic priest (executed)
November 13 – Miguel Pro, Catholic priest (executed)

References

 
1920s in Mexico
Years of the 20th century in Mexico